Purtighat is a village and municipality in Gulmi District in the Lumbini Zone of central Nepal. At the time of the 2011 Nepal census it had a male population 904, female population 1140 & total population of 2044 persons living in 436 individual households.

References

External links
UN map of the municipalities of Gulmi District

Populated places in Gulmi District